2GO also known as 2GO Group Inc. is a Philippines-based company engaged in transporting people and cargo using the fleet of inter-island ferries and cargo ships of the former Aboitiz Transport System, which owned the brands SuperFerry, Cebu Ferries and SuperCat—and Negros Navigation. The top two principal shareholders of the 2GO Group are SM Investments Corp, and Trident Investments.
The company has the largest infrastructure in the Philippines with over 400,000 TEU capacity (approximately 50% market share of domestic Philippine freight), 16 passage and freight vessels, 15,000 containers, 35 warehouses nationwide, 550 trucks, and 7,000 employees.

Company history
The first precursor company to 2GO Group Inc. began on May 26, 1949 under the corporate name William Lines, Inc. Eventually, the Aboitiz Transport System was formed by, first, the breakup of WG&A SuperFerry into SuperFerry and Carlos A. Gothong Lines and then the merging of SuperFerry with Cebu Ferries and SuperCat fast ferries to form the Aboitiz Transport System.

On December 1, 2010, the former major stockholders of the company, namely Aboitiz Equity Ventures and Aboitiz and Company Inc. sold their shares to Negros Navigation Co. Inc. (NENACO), for US$105 million. The equity value included all the logistics and shipping businesses of the company, except its interest in its joint ventures with the Jebsen Group of Norway.

At the same time, December 2010, Negros Navigation announced that the China-Asean Investment Cooperation Fund acquired a controlling stake in the company through an equity infusion.  The China-Asean Investment Cooperation Fund is a Netherlands-based, private equity firm wholly owned and controlled by the Government of the People's Republic of China.  Because Negros Navigation was a privately held firm the exact amount invested by the Fund was not disclosed.  In short, the mainland Chinese government set up the China-Asean Investment Cooperation Fund, which then among other investments in the region took a controlling stake in Negros Navigation, which in turn purchased SuperFerry and related brands and re-branded itself 2GO Group.

Operations

As of August 2021, the shipping fleet owned by the company and its subsidiaries reached 10 operating vessels. The fleet consists of: 9 roll-on/roll-off (RoRo)/Passenger vessels and 1 freighter.

Notes

References

External links
 2GO Group official website

Logistics companies of the Philippines
Shipping companies of the Philippines
Companies listed on the Philippine Stock Exchange
Companies based in Manila